Ganglioside-induced differentiation-associated protein 1 is a type of protein that in humans is encoded by the GDAP1 gene.

This gene encodes a member of the ganglioside-induced differentiation-associated protein family, which may play a role in a signal transduction pathway during neuronal development. Mutations in this gene have been associated with various forms of Charcot-Marie-Tooth Disease and neuropathy. Two transcript variants encoding different isoforms have been identified for this gene.

References

Further reading

External links

 In 
 In 
 In